Murwara Assembly constituency  is one of the 230 Vidhan Sabha (Legislative Assembly) constituencies of Madhya Pradesh state in central India.

Overview
Murwara (constituency number 93) is one of the 4 Vidhan Sabha constituencies located in Katni district. This constituency covers the entire Katni tehsil of the district.

Murwara is part of Khajuraho Lok Sabha constituency along with 2 other Vidhan Sabha segments, namely, Vijayraghavgarh, Bahoriband and Barwara is also in Katni district but part of Shahdol (Lok Sabha constituency).

Members of Legislative Assembly

See also
 Murwara

References

Katni district
Assembly constituencies of Madhya Pradesh